Vermilion High School is a public high school in Vermilion, Ohio. It is the only high school in the Vermilion Local School District.

The school colors are purple and gold. The sports teams are nicknamed the Sailors. The rivalry game between the Sailors and their arch rivals, the Firelands Falcons, is by far the most important game of the year for both teams.

Notable alumni
Allie LaForce, 2005 Miss Teen USA. Current sports reporter for CBS.
Andy Oliver, Baseball pitcher.

Notes and references

External links
Vermilion High School website

High schools in Erie County, Ohio
Public high schools in Ohio